Rheinau is a town in southwestern Baden-Württemberg, Germany and is part of the district of Ortenau.

Geography
Rheinau is located in the Upper Rhine River Plains directly on the Rhine and as such at the German-French border.  The center of town is located immediately on the Rhine crossing to France and the southern borough of Linx is located not far from Kehl and Strasbourg.

Neighbouring communities
Rheinau shares common borders with the following cities and towns, listed clockwise from the north: Lichtenau  (district of Rastatt), Achern, Renchen, Appenweier and Kehl (all in the district of Ortenau) and the Alsatian towns of Gambsheim and La Wantzenau.

Boroughs
Rheinau is made up of the boroughs of Freistett (Hauptort and administrative seat of Rheinau with city hall), Diersheim, Hausgereut, Helmlingen, Holzhausen, Honau, Linx, Memprechtshofen and Rheinbischofsheim.

History
The city of Rheinau was created during the Baden-Württemberg district reform in 1975 through the combination of the formerly independent communities of Freistett, Helmlingen, Memprechtshofen, Rheinbischofsheim, Hausgereut, Diersheim, Linx, Hohbühn, Holzhausen and Honau.

Local council (Elections in May 2014)
 SPD = 11 seats
 IG Handel = 4 seats
 CDU = 12 seats
 Total = 27 seats

People, culture & architecture

Buildings
 Lutheran Church Rheinbischhofsheim: 56 m high, largest church in the area, built in 1876, remodeled in 1998
 Heidenkirchl in Freistett
 St Nikolaus Church

Events
Every Friday morning there is a farmers' market in Freistett.

Economy and infrastructure

Infrastructure
 Rheinau is connected to Achern, Bühl and Kehl by bus lines and belongs to the Public Transportation Authority of the district of Ortenau.

References

External links

 Official site of the city of Rheinau
 Information about and images
 Weberhaus
  Heimatmuseum Rheinau

Ortenaukreis